David Grant (born 2 June 1960) is an English former professional football left-back. He played in the Football League, primarily for Sheffield Wednesday and Rochdale.

Born in Sheffield, Grant became an apprentice with Sheffield Wednesday in July 1976, turning professional in February 1978. He progressed to their first team, playing over 100 times. He moved to Oxford United in 1982. Out of favour during the 1983–84 season, Grant had a spell on loan with Chesterfield before joining Cardiff City. He joined Rochdale in the 1984–85 season playing nearly 100 league games. On leaving Rochdale he joined Macclesfield Town. During the 1988–89 season he had a spell on loan with Mossley, playing four times and scoring once. In December 1988 he left Macclesfield, joining Boston United for a small fee.

References

1960 births
Living people
Footballers from Sheffield
English footballers
Sheffield Wednesday F.C. players
Oxford United F.C. players
Chesterfield F.C. players
Cardiff City F.C. players
Rochdale A.F.C. players
Macclesfield Town F.C. players
Mossley A.F.C. players
Boston United F.C. players
English Football League players
Association football fullbacks